The men's 4 × 100 metres relay event was part of the track and field athletics programme at the 1924 Summer Olympics. It was the third appearance of this event.

As for all other events the track was 500 metres in circumference.

Sixty runners from 15 nations competed.

Records
These were the standing world and Olympic records (in seconds) prior to the 1924 Summer Olympics.

In the first heat the team of the Great Britain set a new world record with 42.0 seconds. This record was equalized in the third heat by the team of the Netherlands. In the sixth heat the American team bettered the world record with a time of 41.2 seconds. On the next day they improved their own record to 41.0 seconds.

Results

Round 1

The heats were held on Saturday, July 12, 1924. The top two in each heat qualified for the semi-finals.

Heat 1

Heat 2

Heat 3

Heat 4

Heat 5

Heat 6

Semifinals

The semifinals were held on Sunday, July 13, 1924. The top two in each heat qualified for the final.

Semifinal 1

Semifinal 2

Semifinal 3

Final

The final was held on Sunday, July 13, 1924.

References

External links
Olympic Report
 

Men's relay 4x100 metre
Relay foot races at the Olympics
4 × 100 metres relay